The Wharekahika River is a river of the Gisborne Region of New Zealand's North Island. It flows east, its course paralleling the north coast of the Gisborne Region, and reaches the sea at Hicks Bay.

See also
List of rivers of New Zealand

References

Rivers of the Gisborne District
Rivers of New Zealand